Northam railway station was a railway station on the Bideford, Westward Ho! and Appledore Railway in north Devon, close to Appledore. The station served the village of Northam, Parish of Northam, a community within the Appledore peninsula.

History 
Northam station was the terminus of the line in 1901 prior to the extension to Appledore in 1908. The station stood a little way from the village of Northam. Many of the passengers were golfers on their way to the links on Northam Burrows.

Infrastructure
Northam had one platform  in length, with a shelter, on the down side of the line. It originally had a short run-around loop, a signal box and one semaphore signal, but with the completion of the extension to Appledore in 1908 it was reduced to a single line without sidings or signalling. A goods yard was provided at one time. The line, without gates, crossed Pimpley Road on the level before reaching the Richmond Road request halt.

Micro history
In January 1901 a one-carriage train ran from Bideford to Northam carrying a few friends of the railway's directors.

Jack Shears, who lived at Northam, was one of the trackmen who worked to maintain the permanent way.

No photographs appear to exist of Northam railway station.

References 

Notes

Sources

 Baxter, Julia & Jonathan (1980). The Bideford, Westward Ho! and Appledore railway 1901-1917. Pub. Chard. .
 Christie, Peter (1995). North Devon History. The Lazarus Press. .
 Garner, Rod (2008). The Bideford, Westward Ho! & Appledore Railway. Pub. Kestrel Railway Books. .
 Griffith, Roger (1969). The Bideford, Westward Ho! and Appledore Railway. School project and personal communications. Bideford Museum.
 Jenkins, Stanley C. (1993). The Bideford, Westward Ho! and Appledore Railway. Oxford : Oakwood Press. .
 Stuckey, Douglas (1962). The Bideford, Westward Ho! and Appledore Railway 1901-1917. Pub. West Country Publications.

Disused railway stations in Devon
Former Bideford, Westward Ho! and Appledore Railway stations
Railway stations in Great Britain opened in 1901
Railway stations in Great Britain closed in 1917
Torridge District